Afghanistan Mujahedin Freedom Fighters Front (AMFF or AMFFF) was a united front of four Afghan paramilitary factions, formed on the initiative of Maoist groups, including the Revolutionary Group of the Peoples of Afghanistan (RGPA, later named Afghanistan Liberation Organization [ALO]) and the Liberation Organization of the People of Afghanistan (SAMA)—together with moderate Islamists including the Afghanistan National Liberation Front, in June 1979. They set aside their ideological differences in the fight against a common enemy. The Front fought against the pro-Soviet government and later also the Soviet Army during the Soviet–Afghan War.

History

On August 5, 1979, the Front tried to initiate an uprising against the Khalq government. The move, which was brutally crushed, became known as the Bala Hissar uprising.

The most famous publication of AMFFF was called Neither Puppet Regime nor Fundamentalism, Freedom and Democracy!, which was widely distributed across Afghanistan in the early 1980s.

The head of AMFFF was Mulavi Dawood, who was abducted and killed by Islamic Party in Peshawar in November 1986.

References

1978 establishments in Afghanistan
Anti-Soviet factions in the Soviet–Afghan War
Maoism in Afghanistan
National liberation armies
Organizations established in 1978
Rebel groups in Afghanistan
Popular fronts